The tenth episode of the Brazilian situation comedy Tá no Ar, first of the second season, premiered on the Globo Network on Thursday night, February 12, 2015.  It was written by series creators Marcelo Adnet and Marcius Melhem, and directed by Maurício Farias.

This episode received generally positive reviews from critics, particularly for the writing and the parodies, besides music played at the end. According to Ibope, the episode were watched by 4.79 million viewers during their original broadcast in São Paulo and Rio de Janeiro, the two major advertising markets in Brazil.

Cast

Reception

Ratings
In its original airing on the Globo network, the tenth episode of Tá no Ar acquired a 13.8 Ibope Rating. This indicates that about 978,015 households and 2.6 million viewers watched this episode in Greater São Paulo. In Rio, the second largest advertising market in Brazil, the episode acquired 20.0 Ibope Rating. This means that 845,000 homes and 2.19 million people watched.

Critical
This episode received generally positive reviews from critics. Renato Kramer, of Folha de S. Paulo, praised the episode, saying "Tá no Ar came back to stay".

References

Tá no Ar
2015 television episodes